What Now is a 2015 American romantic comedy film written and directed by Ash Avildsen. It also stars Avildsen.

Plot
Three best friends explore the world of online swipe dating in Los Angeles and quickly find out that anyone who judges you based on your salary or number of social media followers is someone who has their own soul-searching to do.

DJ works as a disc jockey (DJ) at a strip called named Pink Lips. Bruno works security at Pink Lips, and Joey works as a travel agent. They all live together in B-Murda's house, but it is their last weekend there. B-Murda is getting married, and his fiancé wants his friends to move out. They all decide to try a new dating app at a friend's suggestion. They quickly find out that girls do not like their day jobs, but they can lie about what they do.

The movie culminates in a party at B-Murda's house. Ice-T makes an appearance at the party and performs a live version of "99 Problems".

Cast
 Ash Avildsen as DJ
 Joseph Cassiere as Joey
 Lorenzo Antonucci as Bruno
 Bizzy Bone as B-Murda
 K.D. Aubert as Katrina
 Ice-T as himself
 Rachel Delante as Kelly
 Bridget Avildsen as Rachel
 Jeffree Star as Victoria
 Mark Child as Jock
 Mark Rhino Smith as Danny the Jamaican Barman
 Christine Solomon as Melissa

Release
What Now was released to select theaters March 19, 2015 and on cable and VOD platforms April 3, 2015.

References

External links
 

2015 films
2015 romantic comedy films
American romantic comedy films
American LGBT-related films
American independent films
Transgender-related films
2015 LGBT-related films
LGBT-related romantic comedy films
Films directed by Ash Avildsen
2015 independent films
2010s English-language films
2010s American films